Moon Ji-yoon (18 February 1984 – March 18, 2020) was a South Korean actor and model. He was best known for his supporting roles in Cheese in the Trap, Cheese in the Trap and Weightlifting Fairy Kim Bok-joo.

Biography
Moon Ji-yoon was born on February 18, 1984. He started his acting career in 2002 and also did modeling. He had supporting roles in dramas such as Cheese in the Trap, Weightlifting Fairy Kim Bok-joo and Cheese in the Trap.

Death
Moon Ji-yoon died on March 18, 2020. His agency Dream Stone Entertainment stated that he died due to sore throat condition. His parents held the funeral privately.

Filmography

Television

Film

References

External links 
 
 
 Profile (daum)

1984 births
2020 deaths
21st-century South Korean male actors
South Korean male models
South Korean male television actors
South Korean male film actors
South Korean male web series actors